The Kubang Pasu District is a district in northern Kedah, Malaysia. It contains the border town of Bukit Kayu Hitam as well as the educational hub of Changlun, while Jitra is the largest town and administrative centre of the district. The district council had been upgraded into municipal council on 22 October 2018, become the fifth city or municipal in the state.

History
In the 19th century Kubang Pasu was a semi-independent kingdom, known as Kubang Pasu Darul Qiyam, ruled by Phaya or King Tunku Anom, Prince of Kedah. It was reintegrated into Kedah proper in the 1860s.

On 22 October 2018, Kubang Pasu was granted municipal status; the erstwhile district council was upgraded into a municipal council (Majlis Perbandaran Kubang Pasu).

Geography
The district spans over an area of 948 km2. To the west it borders Perlis, while its northern boundary forms part of the Malaysia-Thailand border. From east to south, in clockwise order, are the constituencies of Padang Terap, Pokok Sena and Kuala Kedah.

Administrative divisions

Kubang Pasu District is divided into 20 mukims, which are:
 Ah
 Binjal
 Bukit Tinggi
 Gelong
 Hosba
 Jeram
 Jerlun
 Jitra
 Kubang Pasu Town
 Malau
 Naga
 Padang Perahu
 Pelubang
 Pering
 Putat
 Sanglang
 Sungai Laka
 Temin
 Tunjang
 Wang Tepus

Demographics

Education
The district is also known as Education Valley in Kedah because there is a concentration of educational institutions in Kubang Pasu. They are Universiti Utara Malaysia, Kolej Matrikulasi Kedah (KMK), Polytechnic of Sultan Abdul Halim Mu'adzam Shah, Industrial Training Institute (ILP), Bandar Darulaman Community College (Kolej Komuniti Bandar Darulaman), Akademi Binaan Malaysia (ABM), Institut Kemahiran Belia Negara (IKBN) and others.

Federal Parliament and State Assembly Seats

List of Kubang Pasu district representatives in the Federal Parliament (Dewan Rakyat) 

List of Kubang Pasu district representatives in the State Legislative Assembly (Dewan Undangan Negeri)

See also
 Districts of Malaysia

References